The Great Old Ones is a horror tabletop role-playing adventure, by Marcus L. Rowland, Kevin A. Ross, Harry Cleaver, Doug Lyons, and L.N. Isinwyll, with art by Tom Sullivan, and published by Chaosium in 1989. The Great Old Ones contains six adventures for Call of Cthulhu. It won the Origins Award for "Best Roleplaying Adventure of 1989".

Plot summary
The Great Old Ones is a book of six loosely linked scenarios involving some of the Cthulhu-mythos Elder Gods:

 "The Spawn", set in New Mexico, involving the disappearance of a labour organizer.
 "Still Waters", a haunted house adventure.
 "Tell Me, Have You See the Yellow Sign", set in New Orleans during Mardi Gras, based on Robert W. Chambers's Yellow Sign.
 "One in Darkness" mixes 1920s gangsters with horror.
 "The Pale God", based on the short story Before the Storm by Ramsey Campbell.
 "Bad Moon Rising", set in England.

None of the adventures has story hooks for any of the other adventures, so the referee can choose to present the adventures as six stand-alone sessions, or find a way to link them together. The book also includes 25 pages of player handouts and Call of Cthulhu character sheets in Japanese, French, German, and Spanish.

Publication history
Originally published as a 176-page perfect-bound book in 1989, it was re-published in PDF format in 2004.

Reception
In the September–October 1989 edition of Games International (Issue #9), Paul Mason warned readers that none of the scenarios were thematically linked, and were designed "for players who don't mind having their actions relatively circumscribed." He was disappointed in the artwork, calling it "distinctly below par." Mason was not impressed with any of the scenarios except "Bad Moon Rising", accusing the book of oversaturating the horror of Lovecraft. He concluded by giving the book an average rating of 3 out of 5, saying, "There is plenty of inventiveness here, but little originality [...] As it is, it'll satisfy diehards who are used to the standard Cthulhu plots, but only "Bad Moon Rising" will hold any appeal for more casual gamers."

In the June 1990 edition of Dragon (Issue #158), Jim Bambra thought that "the strength of this book comes from the variety of adventures available." Bambra liked the first adventure ("The Spawn") because it mixes 1920s politics with horror. He was less pleased with the second adventure ("Still Waters"), saying, "Once you played one spooky house, you've played them all." He liked the New Orleans setting of "Tell Me Have You Seen The Yellow Sign", and thought mixing gangsters with horror was well done in "One in Darkness". For "The Pale God", Bambra thought that anyone who had read Ramsey Campbell's short story Before the Storm "might find their enjoyment of the adventure marred as result." He saved his best compliments for the final adventure, "Bad Moon Rising", calling it "the star of the show. Like a full moon it shines brightly, and it includes some of the finest plot twists ever to appear in a shorter COC adventure." Bambra concluded that this book was "a useful addition to the COC range. The inclusion of “Bad Moon Rising” is reason enough to purchase this book. With the exception of “Still Waters,” the other adventures stand up well, making The Great Old Ones a good source of adventures for Keepers."

References

Call of Cthulhu (role-playing game) adventures
Origins Award winners
Role-playing game supplements introduced in 1989